Vishnu Narayanan is an Indian cinematographer who works in Malayalam cinema. He debuted as a cinematographer in 2012 with Asuravithu. He has been a frequent collaborator of director Ranjith Sankar, with whom he has worked on Punyalan Private Limited (2017), Njan Marykutty (2018), and Pretham 2 (2018). Vishnu's notable films includes Vellimoonga (2014), Aadu (2015), and its sequel Aadu 2 (2017).

Filmography

References

External links
 

Living people
Cinematographers from Kerala
Year of birth missing (living people)